Reedyville is an Unincorporated community in Butler County, Kentucky, United States. The town is supposedly named for the nearby Big Reedy Creek, a tributary of the Green River.

Geography
The community is located in the easternmost portion of Butler County at coordinates . Reedyville is part of the Bowling Green Metropolitan Statistical Area, and is part of Kentucky's Western Coal Fields region.

Until the early 1960s completion of the KY 185 bridge over the Green River just west of Glenmore, the community was served by a ferry that connected the area to Bowling Green. It was one of several ferries that crossed the river prior to the 1960s.

Education
Students in Reedyville attend Butler County Schools in Morgantown, Kentucky, including Butler County Middle and high schools. Since the early 2000s, the closest elementary school to the community is North Butler Elementary, located along KY 70 about halfway between Aberdeen and Jetson.

At one time prior to the 1960s, the Reedyville area's students attended the independently-run Dripping Spring School near the now-extinct community of Threlkel, which has since been demolished.

Points of interest
From 1933–34 to 1951, the U.S. Army Corps of Engineers once operated the Green River Lock and Dam Number 5, located  outside of Reedyville to the south. It, along with lock and dam numbers 4 and 6 in Woodbury and Brownsville, respectively, were shut down due to the failure of all three dams. In 2021, after 70 years of not being used, Green River Lock and Dam Number 5 was slated to be removed to improve recreational safety and to restore free-flowing conditions to a  course of the river from the Mammoth Cave National Park to Rochester.

Since 2016, the area is also home to the Big Reedy Christian Camp. Named for the nearby Big Reedy Creek, the camp is a privately funded summer camp where school-age students from churches throughout the region can attend.

Other points of interest
Honaker's Cemetery
Reedyville Community Center

Post office 
Reedyville's post office was in operation from 1860 to 1964. The town is not currently served by a post office of its own; the village post office in nearby Roundhill is the default post office for Reedyville, thus using the zip code 42275.

Nearby cities
Bowling Green
Brownsville
Morgantown
Richardsville
Roundhill

References

Reedyville
Reedyville